Before Midnight is a 1933 American pre-Code mystery crime film directed by Lambert Hillyer and starring Ralph Bellamy, June Collyer and Claude Gillingwater. Produced and distributed by Columbia Pictures, it was the first in a series of four films featuring Inspector Steve Trent of the NYPD. Bellamy featured in all three sequels One Is Guilty, The Crime of Helen Stanley and Girl in Danger.

Synopsis
NYC Police Inspector Steve Trent is called to the estate of wealthy Edward Arnold around sixty miles outside NYC on a stormy night. Arnold has had a premonition that he is going to be murdered that night.

Cast
 Ralph Bellamy as Police Inspector Steve Trent
 June Collyer as Janet Holt
 Claude Gillingwater as 	John Fry
 Bradley Page as Howard B. Smith
 Betty Blythe as Mavis Fry
 Arthur Pierson as 	Dr. David R. Marsh
 George Cooper as 	Stubby
 William Jeffrey as 	Edward Arnold
 Joseph Crehan as Police Capt. Frank Flynn
 Otto Yamaoka as Kono 
 Kit Guard as Jack 
 Bob Kortman as Plainclothesman 
 Edward LeSaint as Harry Graham 
 Fred 'Snowflake' Toones as 	Taxi Driver

References

Bibliography
 Backer, Ron. Mystery Movie Series of 1930s Hollywood. McFarland, 2012.

External links
 

1933 films
1933 crime films
1933 mystery films
American mystery films
1930s English-language films
American crime films
Columbia Pictures films
American black-and-white films
Films directed by Lambert Hillyer
1930s American films